The later-no-help criterion is a voting system criterion formulated by Douglas Woodall. The criterion is satisfied if, in any election, a voter giving an additional ranking or positive rating to a less-preferred candidate can not cause a more-preferred candidate to win. Voting systems that fail the later-no-help criterion are vulnerable to the tactical voting strategy called mischief voting, which can deny victory to a sincere Condorcet winner.

Complying methods 
Two-round system, Single transferable vote (including traditional forms of  Instant Runoff Voting and Contingent vote), Approval voting, Borda count, Range voting, Bucklin voting, and Majority Judgment satisfy the later-no-help criterion.

When a voter is allowed to choose only one preferred candidate, as in plurality voting, later-no-help can either be considered satisfied (as the voter's later preferences can not help their chosen candidate) or not applicable.

Noncomplying methods 

All Minimax Condorcet methods (including the pairwise opposition variant), Ranked Pairs, Schulze method, Kemeny-Young method, Copeland's method, Nanson's method, and Descending Solid Coalitions, a variant of Woodall's Descending Acquiescing Coalitions, do not satisfy later-no-help. The Condorcet criterion is incompatible with later-no-help.

Checking Compliance 
Checking for failures of the Later-no-help criterion requires ascertaining the probability of a voter's preferred candidate being elected before and after adding a later preference to the ballot, to determine any increase in probability. Later-no-help presumes that later preferences are added to the ballot sequentially, so that candidates already listed are preferred to a candidate added later.

Examples

Anti-plurality 

Anti-plurality elects the candidate the fewest  voters rank last when submitting a complete ranking of the candidates.

Later-No-Help can be considered not applicable to Anti-Plurality if the method is assumed to not accept truncated preference listings from the voter. On the other hand, Later-No-Help can be applied to Anti-Plurality if the method is assumed to apportion the last place vote among unlisted candidates equally, as shown in the example below.

Truncated Ballot Profile 
Assume four voters (marked bold) submit a truncated preference listing A > B = C by apportioning the possible orderings for B and C equally. Each vote is counted  A > B > C, and  A > C > B:

Result: A is listed last on 3 ballots; B is listed last on 2 ballots; C is listed last on 6 ballots. B is listed last on the least ballots. B wins. A loses.

Adding Later Preferences 
Now assume that the four voters supporting A (marked bold) add later preference C, as follows:

Result: A is listed last on 3 ballots; B is listed last on 4 ballots; C is listed last on 4 ballots. A is listed last on the least ballots. A wins.

Conclusion 
The four voters supporting A increase the probability of A winning by adding later preference C to their ballot, changing A from a loser to the winner. Thus, Anti-plurality fails the Later-no-help criterion when truncated ballots are considered to apportion the last place vote amongst unlisted candidates equally.

Coombs' method 

Coombs' method repeatedly eliminates the candidate listed last on most ballots, until a winner is reached. If at any time a candidate wins an absolute majority of first place votes among candidates not eliminated, that candidate is elected.

Later-No-Help can be considered not applicable to Coombs if the method is assumed to not accept truncated preference listings from the voter. On the other hand, Later-No-Help can be applied to Coombs if the method is assumed to apportion the last place vote among unlisted candidates equally, as shown in the example below.

Truncated Ballot Profile 
Assume four voters (marked bold) submit a truncated preference listing A > B = C by apportioning the possible orderings for B and C equally. Each vote is counted  A > B > C, and  A > C > B:

Result: A is listed last on 4 ballots; B is listed last on 4 ballots; C is listed last on 6 ballots. C is listed last on the most ballots. C is eliminated, and B defeats A pairwise 8 to 6. B wins. A loses.

Adding Later Preferences 
Now assume that the four voters supporting A (marked bold) add later preference C, as follows:

Result: A is listed last on 4 ballots; B is listed last on 6 ballots; C is listed last on 4 ballots. B is listed last on the most ballots. B is eliminated, and A defeats C pairwise 8 to 6. A wins.

Conclusion 
The four voters supporting A increase the probability of A winning by adding later preference C to their ballot, changing A from a loser to the winner. Thus, Coombs' method fails the Later-no-help criterion when truncated ballots are considered to apportion the last place vote amongst unlisted candidates equally.

Copeland 

This example shows that Copeland's method violates the Later-no-help criterion. Assume four candidates A, B, C and D with 7 voters:

Truncated preferences 
Assume that the two voters supporting A (marked bold) do not express later preferences on the ballots:

The results would be tabulated as follows:

Result: Both A and B have two pairwise wins and one pairwise tie, so A and B are tied for the Copeland winner. Depending on the tie resolution method used, A can lose.

Express later preferences 
Now assume the two voters supporting A (marked bold) express later preferences on their ballot.

The results would be tabulated as follows:

Result: B now has two pairwise defeats. A still has two pairwise wins, one tie, and no defeats. Thus, A is elected Copeland winner.

Conclusion 
By expressing later preferences, the two voters supporting A promote their first preference A from a tie to becoming the outright winner (increasing the probability that A wins). Thus, Copeland's method fails the Later-no-help criterion.

Dodgson's method 

Dodgson's' method elects a Condorcet winner if there is one, and otherwise elects the candidate who can become the Condorcet winner after the fewest  ordinal preference swaps on voters' ballots.

Later-No-Help can be considered not applicable to Dodgson if the method is assumed to not accept truncated preference listings from the voter. On the other hand, Later-No-Help can be applied to Dodgson if the method is assumed to apportion possible rankings among unlisted candidates equally, as shown in the example below.

Truncated Ballot Profile 
Assume ten voters (marked bold) submit a truncated preference listing A > B = C by apportioning the possible orderings for B and C equally. Each vote is counted  A > B > C, and  A > C > B:

Result:  B is the Condorcet winner and the Dodgson winner. A loses.

Adding Later Preferences 
Now assume that the ten voters supporting A (marked bold) add later preference C, as follows:

Result:  There is no Condorcet winner. A is the Dodgson winner, because A becomes the Condorcet Winner with only two ordinal preference swaps (changing B > A to A > B). A wins.

Conclusion 
The ten voters supporting A increase the probability of A winning by adding later preference C to their ballot, changing A from a loser to the winner. Thus, Dodgson's method fails the Later-no-help criterion when truncated ballots are considered to apportion the possible rankings amongst unlisted candidates equally.

Ranked pairs 

For example, in an election conducted using the Condorcet compliant method Ranked pairs the following votes are cast:

A is preferred to C by 70 votes to 30 votes. (Locked)
B is preferred to A by 42 votes to 28 votes. (Locked)
B is preferred to C by 42 votes to 30 votes. (Locked)

B is the Condorcet winner and therefore the Ranked pairs winner.

Suppose the 28 A voters specify second choice C (they are burying B).

The votes are now:

A is preferred to C by 70 votes to 30 votes. (Locked)
C is preferred to B by 58 votes to 42 votes. (Locked)
B is preferred to A by 42 votes to 28 votes. (Cycle)

There is no Condorcet winner and A is the Ranked pairs winner.

By giving a second preference to candidate C the 28 A voters have caused their first choice to win.  Note that, should the C voters decide to bury A in response, B will beat A by 72, restoring B to victory.

Similar examples can be constructed for any Condorcet-compliant method, as the Condorcet and later-no-help criteria are incompatible.

Commentary 

Woodall writes about Later-no-help, "... under STV [single transferable vote] the later preferences on a ballot are not even considered until the fates of all candidates of earlier preference have been decided. Thus a voter can be certain that adding extra preferences to his or her preference listing can neither help nor harm any candidate already listed. Supporters of STV usually regard this as a very important property, although not everyone agrees; the property has been described (by Michael Dummett, in a letter to Robert Newland) as 'quite unreasonable', and (by an anonymous referee) as 'unpalatable.'"

See also

Later-no-harm criterion

References

Further reading
 Tony Anderson Solgard and Paul Landskroener, Bench and Bar of Minnesota, Vol 59, No 9, October 2002. 
 Brown v. Smallwood, 1915

Electoral system criteria